Villavar was a tribe of hunters lived in Tamilakam, the southern part of ancient India. The word villavar derives from the Dravidian word for bow (vil). The villavars lived in hill tracts and forests. Chera kings used the title villavan
Kulasekhara Alwar the founder of the later Chera dynasty called himself "Villavar Kon", king of Villavars, in a Tamil work written by him known as Perumal Thirumozhi.

Cousin Tribal Group 

The Meenavar , also known as Pattanavar or Sembadavar, are a caste of Tamil Nadu, India.

References

Ezhava of kerala ,
Billava of Karnataka ,
Nadar caste of Tamil Nadu

Modern villavar tribe communities 

1) Ezhava  of Kerala 

2) Billava of Karnataka 

3) Goud of Telangana and Andhra Pradesh

4) Nadar caste of Tamil Nadu 

Dravidian peoples